Joseph Smith, the founder of the Latter Day Saint movement, was charged with approximately thirty criminal actions during his life, and at least that many financial civil suits. Another source reports that Smith was arrested at least 42 times, including in the states of New York, Ohio, Missouri, and Illinois.

In 1844, Smith was killed by a mob in Carthage, Illinois, while in jail awaiting trial on charges of inciting a riot for ordering the destruction of the Nauvoo Expositor, a newspaper critical of Smith which accused him of practicing polygamy, and for treason against the State of Illinois for calling out the Nauvoo Legion contrary to the orders of the Governor of Illinois.

Overview 

While in New York, Smith faced charges of being a "disorderly person" in 1826 and 1830. In Ohio, he was arrested multiple times on a variety of charges. On January 12, 1838, a warrant was issued for Smith's arrest on a charge of banking fraud. Rather than submit to arrest, Smith fled the jurisdiction, escaping Ohio into Missouri.

In Missouri, he was accused of threatening a public official. After his loss in the 1838 Mormon War, Smith was charged with treason against Missouri. Smith was allowed to escape custody and fled the jurisdiction, escaping into Illinois.

In Illinois, Smith faced arrests in connection to his Missouri charges, including a later indictment on the charge of conspiring to assassinate the former Governor of Missouri (while Smith was residing in Illinois). In 1844, he was charged with inciting a riot in the destruction of the Nauvoo Expositor. Smith declared martial law and called out the Nauvoo Legion to enforce it—leading to charges of treason against Illinois. While in jail awaiting trial, Smith was killed by a mob.

Religious significance in Mormonism 
The Church of Jesus Christ of Latter-day Saints (LDS Church) considers Smith to be a persecuted prophet. The Church website states:

Few have confronted more antagonism and trials than did Joseph Smith. He was besieged with dozens of unjustified lawsuits and was often in jeopardy of his life. He was poisoned, beaten, tarred, unjustly imprisoned, and once sentenced to die by firing squad. He and Emma seldom had a home of their own, and six of their children died in infancy. Financial difficulties continually plagued the family.

"As for the perils which I am called to pass through," Joseph reflected, "they seem but a small thing to me, as the envy and wrath of man have been my common lot all the days of my life. It all has become a second nature to me; and I feel, like Paul, to glory in tribulation; for to this day has the God of my fathers delivered me out of them all."

Mormons often liken the treatment of Smith to the persecution of other biblical figures who faced religious persecution. Smith is considered a martyr by the LDS Church due to his 1844 death at the hands of mob while awaiting trial.

Chronology of charges

In New York (1817–30) 

Smith was born in Vermont in 1805, and his family moved to New York in 1817. At age 20, Smith—described in court records as "Joseph the glasslooker"—faced his first criminal charge, a misdemeanor count of being a "disorderly person". In 1830, he faced the same charge. Smith left New York for Ohio.

Disorderly person, March 1826 
On March 20, 1826, Smith was arrested by Constable Philip De Zeng and brought to court in Bainbridge, New York, on the complaint of Josiah Stowell's nephew, who accused Smith of being "a disorderly person and an imposter." An anonymous writer claimed to have been given access to an account of court proceedings, which was published in Fraser's Magazine during 1873. In it, Smith described his divination methods.

This account has been corroborated by later discoveries, such as Justice Neely's bill of costs which refers to Joseph Smith as "The Glass Looker," (i.e. a diviner), discovered in 1971 by Wesley P. Walters. The total costs exactly matched the amount in Fraser's Magazine. However, other contradictory accounts of the trial have also been published which brings the authenticity of the accounts into question. In 1838, Joseph Smith stated that he had, in fact, worked for Josiah Stowell but Smith avoided mentioning the court hearing and downplayed his role by claiming to be a mere bystander. Smith said that Stowell had heard of a lost Spanish silver mine near Harmony, Pennsylvania, and wanted to find it. According to Smith, Stowell "took me, with the rest of his hands, to dig for the silver mine, at which I continued to work for nearly a month, without success in our undertaking, and finally I prevailed with the old gentleman to cease digging after it. Hence arose the very prevalent story of my having been a money-digger."

Disorderly person, June 1830 

Constable Ebenezer Hatch arrested Smith on June 30, 1830, held him over night, and brought him before Justice Joseph P. Chamberlin on a charge of being a disorderly person.  Smith was transported to South Bainbridge, New York. His two-day trial took place in late June, ending on July 1, 1830, and he was defended by two attorneys hired by Joseph Knight. Smith was acquitted. Immediately after his release, however, he was arrested again and transported back to Colesville for a second trial; he was acquitted again.

In Ohio (1831–38) 

In Ohio, Smith faced numerous charges, including charges of illegal banking and banking fraud. In 1838, he fled Ohio for Missouri.

Illegal banking, February 1837 
In February 1837, Samuel D. Rounds swore a writ against Smith and Sidney Rigdon for illegal banking and issuing unauthorized bank paper. At a hearing on March 24, the court found sufficient evidence for the case to go to trial. In October, Smith and Rigdon were tried in absentia after having left Ohio for Upper Canada. They were each found guilty and each fined $1000.

"He was arrested seven times in four months, and his followers managed heroically to raise the $38,428 required for bail."

Conspiracy to murder Newell, June 1837 
According to Grandison Newell, Smith had conspired with Solomon Denton and Marvel C. Davis to murder him for Newell's impugning the integrity of the founders of the Kirtland Safety Society.

On June 3, Smith appeared before Justice Flint in a preliminary hearing. Orson Hyde testified that "Smith seemed much excited and declared that Newell should be put out of the way, or where the crows could not find him: he said destroying Newell would be justifiable in the sight of God, that it was the will of God".  Denton testified that he, along with Davis, were tasked with murdering Newell. According to Denton, Smith spoke of "Newell; said he had injured the society, and that it was better for one man to suffer than to have the whole community disturbed; that it was the will of Heaven that Newell should be put out of the way, and that he would take the responsibility, for the deed was justifiable in the sight of God, and would be rewarded: but when we had killed him, he wanted his body secreted if possible." Smith was released on a $500 bond.

On June 9, at hearing before the County Court, Smith appeared and the charges against him were dismissed.

Banking fraud, 1838 
After a warrant was issued for Smith's arrest on a charge of banking fraud, Smith and Rigdon fled Kirtland for Missouri on the night of January 12, 1838.

In Missouri (1838–39) 

While in Missouri, Smith faced charges of threatening a public official and later, treason. He was allowed to escape custody and fled to Illinois.

Threats to Judge Adam Black, August 1838 
On August 8, Smith led an armed group of over a hundred and surrounded the home of Justice of the Peace Adam Black, who had been elected Judge two days earlier. William P. Peniston gave a sworn statement about the events, and on August 10, 1838, Judge King issued a warrant for the arrest of Smith and Lyman Wight. On August 28, Judge Black gave his own sworn statement of the events.

Sheriff Morgan attempted to arrest Wight, but arrived at Wight's home only to find Wight was protected by an armed force of about 100 men. Missouri newspapers reported that Wight had said "that he would not be taken alive—that the law had never protected him, and he owed them no obedience—that the whole state of Missouri could not take him".

Around August 16, Sheriff William Morgan (of Daviess County), accompanied by Judge Morin, traveled to Far West in Caldwell County, to serve the warrant on Smith. Smith refused to return to Daviess County.

On September 7, Judge King conducted a hearing and found sufficient evidence to send the case to a grand jury. Smith was released on a $500 bond.

Missouri treason case, November 1838–39 

After the surrender of Mormon forces on November 2, 1838, Smith was surrendered to authorities, arrested and imprisoned in the jail at Liberty, Missouri. On November 12, 1838, Judge King found "probable cause to believe that Joseph Smith, Jr, Lyman Wight, Hiram Smith, Alexander McRay & Caleb Baldwin are guilty of Overt acts of Treason in Daviess County". Smith and other Mormons continued to be held at Liberty Jail.

After a hearing conducted April 9–11, 1839, Smith was indicted by grand jury on the charge of treason.

On April 16, 1839, Smith and his companions were permitted to escape custody while they were being escorted to Boone County. Smith fled across the border to Illinois. Missouri would spend several years attempting to apprehend and extradite Smith.

In Illinois (1839–44) 

After fleeing Missouri, Smith faced attempts to extradite him to Missouri on charges of treason and conspiracy to commit murder. Illinois officials charged Smith with incitement of a riot and later, treason against Illinois.

Smith was killed by a mob while he was jailed awaiting trial.

Arrest for fleeing Missouri, 1841 
On June 5, 1841, Smith was arrested as a fugitive from Missouri justice. On June 10, he was freed by Judge Stephen A. Douglas.

Conspiracy to murder Governor Boggs, 1842–43 

On August 8, 1842, Smith and Porter Rockwell were arrested by Illinois law enforcement for their alleged roles in the attempted assassination of former Missouri Governor Lilburn Boggs. The Municipal Court of Nauvoo released Smith and Rockwell, after which they went into hiding. Smith ultimately surrendered to authorities on December 30, and on January 2, 1843, the extradition warrant was quashed by a federal judge in Springfield.

Missouri treason case, June 1843 
On June 6, 1843, Smith was indicted by a grand jury in the circuit court of Daviess County, Missouri, on the charge of treason against the state. On June 13, 1843, Governor Reynolds dispatched Sheriff Joseph H. Reynolds to apprehend Smith. In Illinois, Reynolds was joined by Constable Harmon T. Wilson of Hancock County, Illinois. On June 21, the two placed Smith under arrest near Dixon, Illinois.

Once they had Smith in their custody, Reynolds and Wilson were themselves placed under arrest by Sheriff Campbell of Lee County, Illinois. Campbell transported Smith, Reynolds, and Wilson to the Municipal Court of Nauvoo. On July 1, the Municipal Court of Nauvoo quashed the warrant and freed Smith.

Perjury, fornication and polygamy, May 1844 
In May 1844, a Hancock County grand jury indicted Smith for perjury, fornication and polygamy. The charge of perjury was based on testimony by Joseph H. Jackson and Robert D. Foster, while William Law's testimony led to charges of fornication and polygamy. Smith appeared before the Circuit Court and his trial was postponed until the next term of the court.

Inciting a riot destroying the Nauvoo Expositor, June 1844 

The Nauvoo Expositor was a newspaper that published only one issue, which was dated June 7, 1844. The Expositor was founded by several seceders from Smith's church and was critical of Smith and other church leaders. Those who published the Expositor espoused a belief in Mormonism, but criticized Smith for doctrines such as plural marriage and exaltation.

As mayor, Smith and the Nauvoo City Council declared the newspaper a public nuisance and ordered the press destroyed. The town marshal carried out the order that evening.

On June 11, the Hancock County Justice of the Peace issued a warrant for the arrest of Smith and 17 other individuals on charges of inciting a riot. Constable David Bettisworth was tasked with arresting Smith and conveying him to the Hancock County Court. Rather than return with Bettisworth court, Smith instead petitioned the Municipal Court of Nauvoo to dismiss the charges.

Smith declared martial law in Nauvoo on June 18 and called out the Nauvoo Legion, an organized city militia of about 5,000 men. In response, Governor Ford organized a state militia to arrest Smith.

Smith fled Illinois to avoid arrest, crossing the Mississippi River into Iowa. On June 23, a posse under the command of the governor entered Nauvoo to execute the arrest warrant, but they were unable to locate Smith.

On June 25, Smith and his co-defendants surrendered to Constable Bettisworth on the original charge of inciting a riot. An arraignment was held on the rioting charge and Justice Robert F. Smith granted bail of $500 for each of the defendants.

Treason against Illinois, June 1844 
After bail was granted under the previous charge, Augustine Spencer immediately swore out a warrant alleging that Smith had committed treason by "calling out the [Nauvoo] Legion to resist the force under the command of the Governor." On June 24, 1844, a warrant was issued charging that "Joseph Smith, late of the county aforesaid, did, on or about the nineteenth day of June. A. D. 1844, at the county and state aforesaid, commit the crime of treason against the government and people of the State of Illinois".

Bail could not be granted for a charge of treason, so Smith was placed in jail where he was accompanied by his brother, Hyrum Smith, and other associates. On June 27, Smith and Hyrum were killed by a mob in jail while they were awaiting trial.

Table of events

References

Further reading 
 

History of the Latter Day Saint movement
Criminal justice
Smith, Joseph